Ernst Dospel (born 8 October 1976 in Absdorf) is an Austrian football player who currently plays for Austrian non-league team SV Haitzendorf.

Club career
Dospel started his professional career at Austria Wien where he claimed a regular starting place for over 10 seasons. In summer 2006 he signed a half-year contract with Sturm Graz only to move on to SV Pasching for the remainder of the 2006/2007 season. After a year at SV Ried he joined VfB Admira Wacker Mödling in summer 2008.

International career
He made his debut for Austria in a March 2000 friendly match against Sweden and went on to earn 19 caps, scoring no goals. His last international was an April 2005 friendly match against Scotland.

National team statistics

Honours
Austrian Football Bundesliga (2):
 2003, 2006
Austrian Cup (3):
 2003, 2005, 2006

References

External links
 Player profile - Austria Archiv
 
 Profile at Weltfussball.de

1976 births
Living people
People from Tulln District
Austrian footballers
Austria under-21 international footballers
Austria international footballers
FK Austria Wien players
SK Sturm Graz players
SV Ried players
FC Admira Wacker Mödling players
First Vienna FC players
Austrian Football Bundesliga players
Association football defenders
Footballers from Lower Austria